Club Colonial is a football club of Martinique, playing in the town of Fort-de-France. They played in the Martinique's first division, the Martinique Championnat National in 2007, but in the end of the season they were relegated to Martinique Promotion d'Honneur

In 2009, the club were promoted back to the Martinique Championnat National.

Achievements
 Martinique Championnat National
 Champions (19): 1920, 1921, 1922, 1923, 1924, 1926, 1930, 1931, 1935, 1938, 1940, 1941, 1942, 1943, 1949, 1964, 1965, 1971–72, 2010–11. (record - shared)

 Coupe de la Martinique: 5
 1955, 1959, 1962, 1980, 2014.

 Trophée du Conseil Général: 3
 2011, 2013, 2014.

 Ligue des Antilles: 1
2012

 Coupe Radio Caraïbes: 1
1979-1980

The club in the French football structure
 French Cup: 5 appearances
1963–64, 1979–80, 1983–84, 2012–13, 2017–18

Former presidents (1906–present)
 Siron Pélière-Donatien
 Pierre Joseph-Noël
 Simon Pierre
 Ferriez Elizabeth (1938–76)
 Yvon Alpha (1976-01)
 Charles Ho Hio Hen (2001–)

References

Football clubs in Martinique
Fort-de-France
Association football clubs established in 1906
1906 establishments in Martinique